Sessions at West 54th is a live album by the American singer/songwriter Suzanne Vega. It was recorded on June 16, 1997, via the notable auspices of Sessions at West 54th and was released on August 18, 1997 on CD.

Track listing 
 "Marlene on the Wall" - 3:19
 "Gypsy" - 4:31
 "Caramel" - 2:59
 "Small Blue Thing" - 4:08
 "World Before Columbus" - 3:21
 "Luka" - 3:17
 "Cracking" - 3:06
Total Playing Time - 24:41

References 

1997 live albums
1998 live albums
Suzanne Vega albums